Doh Kyung-soo (born January 12, 1993), also professionally known as  D.O., is a South Korean singer and actor, best known as a member of the South Korean-Chinese boy group Exo. Apart from his group's activities, D.O. has starred in various television dramas and movies such as Pure Love (2016), My Annoying Brother (2016), Positive Physique (2016), Room No.7 (2017), 100 Days My Prince (2018), Along with the Gods: The Two Worlds,  Swing Kids (2018) and Bad Prosecutor (2022). In 2021, he debuted as a soloist with his first extended play, Empathy. In addition, D.O. was selected by the Korean Film Council as one of the 200 Korean actors that best represent the present and future of Korea's movie scene.

Life and career

1993–2015: Early life and career beginnings

D.O. was born on January 12, 1993, in Nonhyeon-dong of Gangnam District, Seoul, South Korea, and grew up in Ilsandong-gu of Goyang, Gyeonggi Province. He went to Goyang Poongsan Elementary School, Baekshin Middle School, and Baekseok High School. He has an older brother who is three years older than him. D.O. began singing in primary school and was an avid participant in local singing competitions throughout his high school career. After winning one of the competitions, he was advised to audition for SM Entertainment. He performed Na Yoon-kwon's "Anticipation" and Brown Eyed Soul's "My Story" at his audition. D.O. subsequently became a trainee during his last two years of high school.

D.O. was formally introduced as the eighth member of Exo on January 30, 2012, with the release of the Korean version of the single "What Is Love", sung by D.O. and Baekhyun. The group debuted on April 8 with the extended play Mama. In July 2013, he was featured in the song "Goodbye Summer" from f(x)'s second studio album Pink Tape. In September 2014, D.O. made his acting debut with a supporting role in the movie Cart, playing a high school student and son of a grocery store worker and union member (played by Yum Jung-ah). The movie premiered at the 2014 Toronto International Film Festival. He also released an original soundtrack titled "Crying Out" for the movie.

Later in 2014, D.O. made his small screen debut playing a supporting role in the SBS drama It's Okay, That's Love, which starred Gong Hyo-jin and Jo In-sung. D.O. was praised by film critic Heo Ji-woong for his performance in the series, and was later nominated for the Best New Actor award at the 51st Baeksang Arts Awards. In June 2015, D.O. featured in KBS' drama Hello Monster, playing a psychopath. In November 2015, D.O. was nominated for the Best Supporting Actor award at the 52nd Grand Bell Awards for his role as Tae-young in Cart.

2016–2020: Lead roles, recognition and military service
In January 2016, D.O. was announced as one of the cast of voice actors for the feature-length animated film Underdog, which premiered in 2019. He voiced Moongchi, a stray dog who is separated from his owner. In February 2016, he collaborated with Yoo Young-jin on a duet titled "Tell Me (What Is Love)" for SM Station. He had previously performed a short version of the song as a solo performance throughout Exo's first concert tour. Later in February, D.O. starred as the male lead alongside actress Kim So-hyun in the romantic film Pure Love.
In October 2016, D.O. starred alongside Chae Seo-jin in the web drama Be Positive. The series became the most watched Korean web drama of all time. In November 2016, D.O. starred alongside Jo Jung-suk and Park Shin-hye in the film My Annoying Brother, playing a national level Judo athlete. D.O. and Jo Jung-suk also recorded the ending theme song, titled "Don't Worry", for the movie. D.O. was awarded the Blue Dragon Film Awards Best New Actor award a year later for his performance in the film.

In 2017, D.O. starred in the comedy thriller film Room No.7. The same year, he played a supporting role in Kim Yong-hwa's film Along With the Gods: The Two Worlds, a blockbuster adaptation of the webtoon of the same name, about a court in the afterlife where the deceased undergo multiple trials for 49 days. In December 2017, D.O. attended the Macau International Film Festival alongside director Choi Dong-hoon as a Korean public relations ambassador. In 2018, D.O. starred in Swing Kids, a film set in a prison camp in South Korea during the Korean War. He plays a North Korean soldier who falls in love with tap dancing in the midst of all the chaos. Later that year, he was cast in his first small-screen leading role, playing a crown prince in 100 Days My Prince. The series was a commercial success, becoming the fifth highest-rated Korean drama in cable television history and in 2020, became the first CJ ENM drama to be broadcast in Japan's public television channel, NHK General TV.

Military Service 
Later in May, D.O. was reported to be among the conscripted soldiers for July, to the surprise of many. Shortly after the news, he posted a handwritten letter on EXO's official fan club confirming and announcing his upcoming enlistment for South Korea's mandatory military service. He enlisted as an active duty soldier on July 1, 2019. On the same day, he released the single "That's Okay", a song that he co-wrote, through the SM Station project as a gift for his fans. After completing his training, he served at the Capital Mechanized Infantry Division (Fierce Tiger Division) as a food handler (kitchen police).

In 2020, D.O. participated in the Taegeukgi (Korean Flag) Campaign for the 70th anniversary of Korean War and was cast in a commemorative rerun of the original military musical Return: The Promise of the Day, playing the role of young Seungho, marking it as his musical theater debut. A special run of the musical was broadcast live via Naver TV on June 10, 2020. Due to COVID-19 protocols, in-person performances were cancelled and shifted to online broadcast between September 24 to 26, 2020.

During his service, Doh Kyung-soo also participated in Military Manpower Administration's "I Am Proud" campaign. He was also selected in the South Korea's Ministry of Justice awareness campaign against "Digital Sexual Exploitation".

After taking his final military vacation leave in December 2020 without returning to his base in compliance with the army's protocols regarding the COVID-19 pandemic, D.O. was officially discharged on January 25, 2021.

2021–present: Return to acting and solo debut
In October 2020, prior his discharge, he was announced to be cast in Kim Yong-hwa's next film, The Moon, where he will play the lead role of Hwang Seon-woo, an astronaut left in space due to an unforeseen accident. The filming began in June 2021 and concluded on October 12, 2021. The film is currently in post-production and set to be released on 2023.

In February 2021, he was announced to have been cast as the male lead in Secret, a South Korean remake of the 2007 Taiwanese film of the same name. His role in the movie is a student who plays the piano. The filming began in November 2021 and cranked up in January 2022.

In March 2021, Kyung-soo was selected as one of the 200 actors for "The Actor is Present" campaign by the Korean Film Council (KOFIC) to represent the past and present of the Korean Cinema. His profile was unveiled in May 2021.

On June 25, 2021, SM Entertainment announced that D.O. would release his first solo album at the end of July 2021. His first extended play Empathy was released on July 26, along with its lead single "Rose". D.O. had participated in writing the lyrics for his lead single, "Rose" and "I'm Fine." The album topped the Gaon Album Chart.

In 2022, Doh Kyung-soo was announced as the next actor to feature in the 2-episode travel show by Discovery Channel Korea, Off The Grid, where he took a 3 days, 2 nights solo roadtrip to Namhae and the southern side of South Korea. His episodes aired in May 2022.

D.O. made his return to the small screen with KBS2's Wed-Thurs drama series, Bad Prosecutor in OCtober 2022, where he played the lead role of Jin Jeong, a delinquent prosecutor who fights for justice. He earned Top Excellence Award (Actor) in the 2022 KBS Drama Award for his performance.

In 2023, D.O. is set to appear in SBS's variety show, No Math School Trip by former director of Running Man, Choi Bo-pil, alongside with Zico, Crush, Choi Jung-hoon, Lee Yong-jin, and Yang Se-chan.

Discography

Extended play

Singles

Other songs

Songwriting 
All credits are adapted from KOMCA's database, unless cited otherwise.

Filmography

Film

Television series

Television shows

Web series

Music videos

Theater

Awards and nominations

Notes

References

External links

 
 
 

1993 births
Living people
People from Goyang
Exo members
Mandarin-language singers of South Korea
South Korean contemporary R&B singers
South Korean electronic music singers
South Korean male idols
South Korean pop singers
South Korean male film actors
South Korean male singers
South Korean male television actors
South Korean male web series actors
South Korean mandopop singers
K-pop singers
Seongju Do clan